The basketball tournament at the 2013 Mediterranean Games in Mersin took place between 18 June and 25 June. The men's tournament was held at the Servet Tazegül Arena. A women's tournament was also planned, but was cancelled because too few teams applied.

Participating nations
Following nations applied to compete in men's tournament. Albania and Greece declared the withdrawal of their teams from the Games on May 10, 2013. Algeria will be participating in place of Albania. At least six nations competing is the requirement for tournament to be held. None of the Asian nations have applied to compete.

Men

Preliminary round
All times are Eastern European Summer Time (UTC+3).

Group A

Group B

Elimination stage

Championship bracket

Fifth place match

Semifinals

Bronze medal match

Gold medal match

Final standings

Medal summary

Events

References

Basketball
Basketball at the Mediterranean Games
International basketball competitions hosted by Turkey
2012–13 in Turkish basketball
2012–13 in European basketball
2013 in African basketball